Bobby Doyle, father of Ronan Doyle, is a former Gaelic footballer who played for the Dublin county team. Renowned more as a hurler, he made his name with the Dublin football team as a free-running and free-scoring forward.

Year of birth missing (living people)
Living people
Dual players
Dublin inter-county Gaelic footballers
St Vincents (Dublin) Gaelic footballers
Winners of three All-Ireland medals (Gaelic football)
People educated at St. Joseph's CBS, Fairview